= List of ambassadors of Ukraine to Cuba =

Ambassador of Ukraine to Cuba

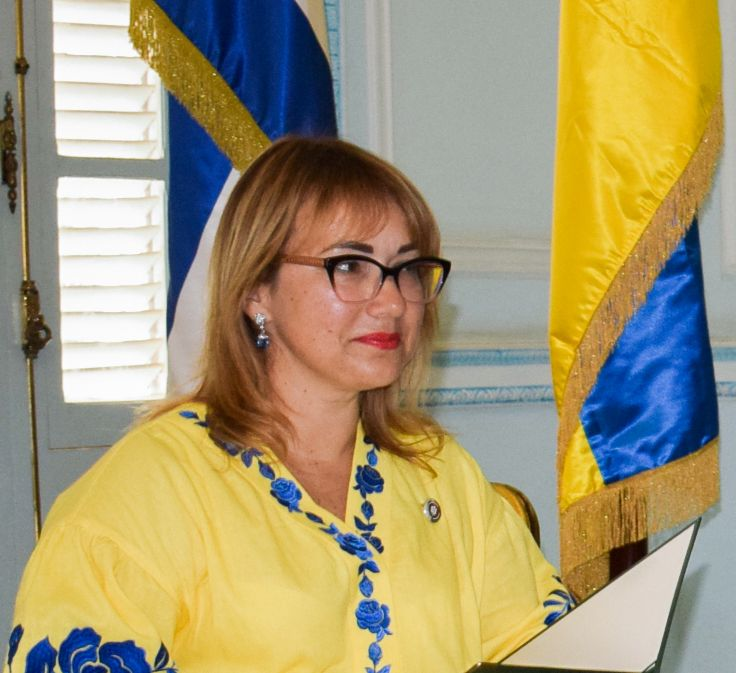
- Incumbent; Iryna Kostyuk since 2022
- Nominator: Volodymyr Zelenskyy
- Inaugural holder: Oleksandr Taranenko as Ambassador Extraordinary and Plenipotentiary
- Formation: 1993
- Website: Ukraine Embassy - Havana

The Ambassador Extraordinary and Plenipotentiary of Ukraine to Cuba (Ukrainian: Надзвичайний і Повноважний посол України на Кубі) is the ambassador of Ukraine to Cuba. The current ambassador is Iryna Kostyuk. She assumed the position in 2022.

The first Ukrainian ambassador to Cuba assumed his post in 1992, the same year a Ukrainian embassy opened in Havana.

== List of ambassadors ==
=== Ukraine ===
- 1995–1997 – Oleksandr Taranenko
- 1997–1997 – Oleksandr Kulinich (Charge d'Affairs)
- 1997–2000 – Yevhen Svynarchuk
- 2000–2001 – Volodymyr Krasilchuk (Charge d'Affairs)
- 2001–2005 – Viktor Pashchuk
- 2005–2005 – Viktor Kharaminsky (Charge d'Affairs)
- 2005–2008 – Oleksandr Hniedykh
- 2008–2009 – Oleksandr Khrypunov (Charge d'Affairs)
- 2009–2013 – Tetiana Sayenko
- 2013–2013 – Volodymyr Kozlov (Charge d'Affairs)
- 2013–2014 – Oleksandr Bozhko
- 2014 – Oleksandr Kyrychok (Charge d'Affairs)
- From May 4, 2022 for now – Kostyuk Iryna Kostyantinivna — Ambassador Extraordinary and Plenipotentiary of Ukraine to the Republic of Cuba.
